Han Jung-kook (born 19 July 1971) is a South Korean footballer.

Club career
Han has spent most of his club career playing for Ilhwa Chunma and Daejeon Citizen

International career
He has played in 1992 Summer Olympics.

Football Officials 
He was appointed Secretary General of Busan IPark. He was the first Secretary General from players

Honours

Club 
 Ilhwa Chunma
 K League (2) 1994, 1995
 Asian Club Championship (1) 1995

References 

Han Jung-kook interview at KFA.com

External links 
 
 

1971 births
Living people
Association football forwards
South Korean footballers
Seongnam FC players
Jeonnam Dragons players
Daejeon Hana Citizen FC players
K League 1 players
Footballers at the 1992 Summer Olympics
Olympic footballers of South Korea
Hanyang University alumni
Association football midfielders
Footballers at the 1994 Asian Games
Asian Games competitors for South Korea